Ragnvald Soma (born 10 November 1979) is a Norwegian footballer who plays as a defender for his childhood club Frøyland Idrettslag. He signed for them 02.02.2014 effectively retiring from professional football.

Position
He is primarily a central defender, although he has been both a left back and a defensive midfielder earlier in his career.

Club career

Early career
Soma started his professional career in Bryne FK, amassing 99 league games.

West Ham United
In January 2001 he moved to English Premier League club West Ham United for £800,000. His stay there lasted just over one and a half years, during which Soma made only seven league appearances before returning to Bryne on a free transfer. Whilst at West Ham he played in their 1–0 victory over Manchester United at Old Trafford in the 2000–01 FA Cup, coming on as a late substitute for his debut.

Norwegian football
With Bryne relegated at the end of the 2003 season, Soma moved to SK Brann. He became an instant hit, being voted player of the year by several newspapers and becoming a regular in the Norway national team. In March 2006 he transferred to Viking for an undisclosed fee believed to be around £500,000, with Brann also getting right back Bjørn Dahl as a part-exchange.

Austria and Denmark
After over three years at Viking, Soma signed for Rapid Vienna on 14 August 2009.

After a spell with the Danish Superliga side Nordsjælland, Soma joined the Danish 1st Division side Lyngby. After his contract with Lyngby expired, he was training with his old club Viking. He played the second half of 2013 for Førde IL.

International career
Soma played 22 matches for the Norwegian under-21 team before he was capped five times while playing for Norway between 2004 and 2005.

Career statistics

References

External links

rogalandsavis.no

1979 births
Living people
Norwegian footballers
Norway international footballers
Norwegian Christians
Bryne FK players
West Ham United F.C. players
SK Brann players
Viking FK players
SK Rapid Wien players
FC Nordsjælland players
Lyngby Boldklub players
Association football central defenders
Premier League players
Austrian Football Bundesliga players
Eliteserien players
Danish Superliga players
Norwegian expatriate footballers
Expatriate footballers in England
Norwegian expatriate sportspeople in England
Expatriate footballers in Austria
Norwegian expatriate sportspeople in Austria
Expatriate men's footballers in Denmark
Norwegian expatriate sportspeople in Denmark
Sportspeople from Rogaland